Shazia Naz is a Pakistani model and actress. She made her on-screen debut in ARY Digital's Mera Pehla Pyar opposite Faysal Quraishi and since then has appeared in many television series. She made her cinematic debut with 2017 film Josh: Independence Through Unity.

Filmography 
 Josh: Independence Through Unity

Television

References 

1988 births
Living people
Pakistani television actresses
21st-century Pakistani actresses